Kotwali Thana is a thana of Khulna Metropolitan Police in the Division of Khulna, Bangladesh.  It is also known as Khulna Sadar.  It is the most densely populated subdistrict in the division.

Geography
It has 36895 households and total area 9.45 km2.

Demographics
At the 1991 Bangladesh census, Kotwali Thana had a population of 191,910, of whom 111,725 were aged 18 or older. Males constituted 54.87% of the population, and females 45.13%. It had an average literacy rate of 59.7% (7+ years), against the national average of 32.4%. At the 2001 census it had a population of 250,651, and at the 2011 census, 224,444.

See also
 Thanas of Bangladesh
 Upazilas of Bangladesh
 Districts of Bangladesh
 Divisions of Bangladesh

References

Khulna District